Seán Hayes (1890 – 16 February 1968) was an Irish politician. He was a Fianna Fáil Teachta Dála (TD) for 10 year, and later a senator for 22 years.

Hayes was first elected to Dáil Éireann at the June 1927 general election as a TD for the Tipperary constituency, and held the seat until his defeat at the 1937 general election. He stood again at the 1943 general election and at by-election in 1947, but never returned to the Dáil.

In the 1938 election to the reconstituted Seanad Éireann, he was elected by the Labour Panel, and held the seat at the further election later that year to the 3rd Seanad. He lost his seat at the 1943 Seanad election. He was re-elected by the Labour Panel at the 1948 election to the 6th Seanad, and at subsequent elections until he stepped down at the 1965 election.

References

1890 births
1968 deaths
Fianna Fáil TDs
Members of the 5th Dáil
Members of the 6th Dáil
Members of the 7th Dáil
Members of the 8th Dáil
Members of the 2nd Seanad
Members of the 3rd Seanad
Members of the 6th Seanad
Members of the 7th Seanad
Members of the 8th Seanad
Members of the 9th Seanad
Members of the 10th Seanad
Irish farmers
Fianna Fáil senators